Mortonagrion is a genus of damselfly in the family Coenagrionidae. It contains the following species:
Mortonagrion aborense 
Mortonagrion amoenum 
Mortonagrion appendiculatum 
Mortonagrion arthuri 
Mortonagrion ceylonicum  - Sri Lanka Midget
Mortonagrion falcatum 
Mortonagrion forficulatum 
Mortonagrion hirosei  - Four-spot Midget
Mortonagrion martini 
Mortonagrion selenion 
Mortonagrion stygium 
Mortonagrion varralli

References

Coenagrionidae
Zygoptera genera
Taxa named by Frederic Charles Fraser
Taxonomy articles created by Polbot